Aneta Georgieva (born 15 February 1994 in Skopje) is a Macedonian footballer. She plays as a forward for the North Macedonia national team.

International career
Georgieva made her debut for the North Macedonia national team on 3 March 2011, against Lithuania.

References

1994 births
Living people
Women's association football forwards
Macedonian women's footballers
North Macedonia women's international footballers